KTIS may refer to:

KTIS (AM), a radio station (900 AM) licensed to Minneapolis, Minnesota, United States
KTIS-FM, a radio station (98.5 FM) licensed to Minneapolis, Minnesota, United States